Te Rā / Dagg Sound is a narrow fiord located in Fiordland, New Zealand. It lies south of Doubtful Sound / Patea and north of Te Puaitaha / Breaksea Sound. Whales frequent the waters out from the entrance of the fiord, close to the edge of the continental shelf where the water depth suddenly drops to thousands of metres.

Anchorage Arm branches off to the north of the fiord. At the eastern end of the fiord there is a short  portage through to Crooked Arm in Doubtful Sound / Patea.

{ "type": "ExternalData", "service": "geoshape", "ids": "Q32172236", "properties": { "fill": "#0050d0"}}

Naming
The fiord was named Dagg Sound after named after the Captain of the whaling boat, Scorpion, who visited it in 1804. In October 2019, the name of the fiord was officially altered to Te Rā / Dagg Sound.

References

Fiords of New Zealand
Sounds of Fiordland